

See also 
 Virginia's 5th congressional district special election, 1804
 Virginia's 13th congressional district special election, 1804
 United States House of Representatives elections, 1804 and 1805
 List of United States representatives from Virginia

Notes 

1805
Virginia
United States House of Representatives